Aastik is a 1956 Hindi film starring Shahu Modak, Paro Devi and Meenakshi in lead roles. The music was composed by Narayan Dutt.

Cast
 Shahu Modak
 Paro Devi
 Meenakshi
 B. M. Vyas

Music

References

External links

Films scored by Narayan Dutt
1950s Hindi-language films